Ugo Cerroni (born March 15, 1915 in Rome) was an Italian professional football player.

He played for 2 seasons (15 games, 1 goal) in the Serie A for A.S. Roma and ACF Fiorentina.

1915 births
Year of death missing
Italian footballers
Serie A players
A.S. Roma players
ACF Fiorentina players
Association football midfielders